Algestrup is a small railway town with a population of 876 (1 January 2022). The town is located in the southern part of Køge Municipality in Region Zealand, Denmark, just north of the boundary between Køge and Faxe Municipality, on the Lille Syd railway between Køge and Haslev.

In spite of the fact that a railway station is located in the southern part of Algestrup, the station is not named Algestrup station but Tureby station, named after two manor houses Turebylille and Turebyholm in Faxe Municipality about 2 and 4 kilometres south of the station.

References

Cities and towns in Region Zealand
Køge Municipality